John Crookshanks King (1806–1882) was a Scotland-born sculptor in Boston, Massachusetts, in the 19th century. He created portraits of John Quincy Adams, Louis Agassiz, Robert Burns, Ralph Waldo Emerson, Horace Greeley, Walter Scott, Daniel Webster, Samuel B. Woodward and others. Around 1852 he kept a studio in Boston's Tremont Temple.

References

External links

 WorldCat. King, John Crookshanks 1806-1882
 U.S. House of Representatives. Boggs Room

1806 births
1882 deaths
Artists from Boston
19th century in Boston
19th-century American sculptors
19th-century American male artists
American male sculptors
British emigrants to the United States
Sculptors from Massachusetts